Cătălin Costache (born July 31, 1987) is a Romanian sprint canoer who has been competing since the late 2000s. He won a bronze medal in the C-4 1000 m event at the 2009 ICF Canoe Sprint World Championships in Dartmouth, Nova Scotia.

References
Canoe09.ca profile

1987 births
Living people
Romanian male canoeists
ICF Canoe Sprint World Championships medalists in Canadian